Henry Herbert Loveday (20 May 1864 – 19 January 1913) was a British railway executive who was general manager of the Central Argentine Railway from 1895 to 1910. He was a chief inspector of the Midland Railway Company in Derby, England. In 1877, he gave evidence in court for the prosecution relating to the theft of the company's property.

Loveday died on 19 January 1913 at his home of Oak Lodge, Totteridge Common, London. He is remembered on a memorial plaque at St Andrew's Church, Totteridge.

References

Further reading
Damus, S. (2008) Who was who in Argentine railways, 1860-1960. Ottawa: DIA Agency.

External links 

1864 births
1913 deaths
Totteridge
British people in rail transport
Rail transport in Argentina
St Andrew's church, Totteridge
English Freemasons
19th-century English businesspeople